Ṣadr al-Dīn Muḥammad ibn Isḥāq ibn Muḥammad ibn Yūnus Qūnawī [alternatively, Qūnavī, Qūnyawī], (1207–1274), was a Persian philosopher, and one of the most influential thinkers in mystical or Sufi philosophy. He played a pivotal role in the study of knowledge—or epistemology, which in his context referred specifically to the theoretical elaboration of mystical/intellectual insight. He combined a highly original mystic-thinker, Muḥyī al-Dīn Ibn 'Arabī (1165-1240 CE/560-638 AH), whose arcane teachings Qūnavī codified and helped incorporate into the burgeoning pre-Ottoman intellectual tradition, on the one hand, with the logical/philosophical innovations of Ibn Sīnā (Lat., Avicenna), on the other. Though relatively unfamiliar to Westerners, the spiritual and systematic character of Qūnawī's approach to reasoning, in the broadest sense of the term, has found fertile soil in modern-day Turkey, North Africa and Iran not to mention India, China, the Balkans and elsewhere over the centuries.

Biography
Little is known about Qūnawī's personal life. As a young boy, Ṣadr al-Dīn was adopted by Ibn 'Arabī, whose pupil he was. Of Persian descent, he nevertheless lived and taught in the city of Konya (modern-day Turkey where he is known as Sadreddin Konevî). There he drew very close to Mawlāna Jalāl-e Dīn Rūmī and participated in his spiritual circle.

A master of ḥadīth, people came to Konya from distant lands just to study under him. But while he was reputed for his profound understanding of the Quran and Ḥadīth, he knew the ancient Peripatetic philosophy intimately, no doubt thanks chiefly to Ibn Sīnā, who commented extensively on the works of Aristotle. However, Qūnawī himself may have studied an Arabic translation of Aristotle's "Metaphysics," being one of a handful of truly insightful, post-Avicennan critics of Aristotle, even if he was not a full-fledged commentator in the spirit of Ibn Rushd.

Qūnawī's overall influence appears more strategic than wide. Moreover, some of his students found fame. He instructed Qutb al-Din al-Shirazi, who went on to author a commentary, now well-known, on Suhrawardi's Ḥikmat al-Ishrāq. Another student of Qūnawī's, the Sufi poet Fakhr-al-Din Iraqi, was instrumental in introducing Ibn 'Arabī into the Persian language.

Mystical vs. philosophical knowledge
After visiting the grave of Ibn 'Arabī a spell after his teacher and father-in-law had died, Qūnavī described a mystical experience he had about his teacher, Ibn 'Arabī, thus:I walked one summery day through an empty stretch in the Taurus. An easterly wind was stirring the blossoms. I gazed at them and reflected upon God's power, might and majesty (exalted be He). The love of the Merciful [God] filled me with such ardent passion that I labored to part with created things. Then, the spirit of Shaykh Ibn 'Arabī was personified to me in the most splendid form, as if he were a pure light. He called out [to me], “O ye who are perplexed, behold me! If God sublime and transcendent hath shown Himself to me in a flash of manifestation from the noble elevation of the essence, absent hast thou been from me therein by a mere glance of an eye.” I agreed at once and, as if he had been standing there [bodily] before my eyes, the Shaykh al-Akbar [i.e., Ibn Arabī] greeted me with the salutations of reunion after a parting and embraced me affectionately, saying: “Praise be to God who the veil hath lifted and who bringeth those dear unto each other into reunion. No goal, effort or salvation hath been disaffirmed".His recollection of this dream seems to indicate not just continuing deference to his teacher, but also what he saw as the practical end of reason. Though a different intellectual breed than his deceased mentor, Qūnavī too was a practising mystic, not just a thinker and teacher. In other words, he was a mystic who excelled in formal sciences like ḥadīth studies, Qurānic exegesis (tafsīr), dialectical theology (kalām), jurisprudence (fiqh), and philosophical sciences; and he corresponded with contemporaries like Nāsīr al-Dīn Ṭūsī, whose mathematical and astronomical discoveries have become integral to the science we know today.

Qūnavī's significance arises from his firm place in Islam's "post-Avicennan" (or, more precisely, post-Falsafah) period, of which Latin European Scholastics (themselves struggling with the problematics posed by Avicenna) were likely oblivious. And yet, the intellectual current to which he belonged provided the context for, among other developments, the development of systematic reason and the elaborate philosophical tradition that emerged in Iran, including the prodigal Sadr al-Din Shirazi, also called Mulla Sadra.

Although Qūnavī was single-mindedly devoted to the same general philosophical framework as Ibn 'Arabī's 'Abd al-Raḥmān Jāmī assured us that, despite the pupil's frustrated attempts to follow in his spiritual footsteps,[34] without a proper study of Qūnavī's works the true intention of Ibn 'Arabī regarding the so-called doctrine of Waḥdat al-Wujūd (a doctrine progeny has ascribed to Ibn 'Arabī) could not be discerned in any manner conforming to both reason and religious law (Jāmī 556). His relationship with the aging teacher notwithstanding, Qūnavī had to stake out his own personal connection to higher knowledge. At times, it seems, he distanced himself from Ibn 'Arabī altogether due to the emphasis on personal witness above the interpretation of others’ experience regardless of their social or spiritual station. Al-Munāwī (b. 1265) quoted him as saying that his teacher had striven to lead him to a level where God manifested Himself through flashes of manifestation to all seekers, but that he failed (NJK 222). Mystics describe a manifestation of this kind as a “flash,” because the “direct witnessing of the essence” resembles the light, speed, and evanescence of any ordinary flash or lightning.

Al-Qāshānī likened the “flash” to “the illumination appearing to a person that beckons and summons to the Presence of Proximity to the Lord for a journey within God.” Ibn 'Arabī referred to the deep tranquility felt by the saintly “friends of God,” the awliyā’, who take their repose in it. Because tranquility did not always occur to them, they could only take furtive glances at the manifestation, as if in a flash (Hakim 660–61).

Paradoxically, then, his relationship with Ibn 'Arabī provided Qūnavī with a sound justification for seeking a separate path to spiritual enlightenment, on the one hand, and for developing the proper terms with which to express overarching truths, on the other, which truths paradoxically were accessible only through personal experience, not anyone else's.

Problem of knowledge
Qūnavī considered it his life's task to complete what Ibn Sīnā had begun with his Ishrāqī conception of knowledge. First, he shared with Ibn Sīnā and Ibn 'Arabī the goal of representing the intellectual/spiritual journey in communicable fashion. For any kind of knowledge or noetic discovery to be understood, it must be capable of being passed on to others (pupils, speculatively minded peers, etc.), rather than hoarded in the abstract ether of the mind, as it were. Whatever its technical complexities, it had to be didactically meaningful within a specific time and place, though without losing sight of the root object of knowledge.

He worked out his principles in several treatises. Their most concise and substantial statement consists of a theoretical introduction to his magnum opus, "I'jāz al-bayān," the main body of which consists of a mystical exegesis of the "Sūrat al-Fātiḥah," the opening chapter of the Quran. In that introduction, Qūnavī plotted the transition from the demonstrative logic of Avicenna's “theological science”, 'ilm ilāhī), to a different kind of logic one might call an “exegetical grammar,” as more or less taught by Ibn 'Arabī.

To the followers of Ibn 'Arabī, “exegetical grammar” was vastly more suited to the paradoxical movements of the spirit, “dialogue” with God, and in a purely epistemological sense, the true “knowledge of the realities,” an expression that Qūnavī took to be chiefly of Avicennan inspiration. Anxious to preserve the transcendence of the Divine, but without expunging human activity or initiative, Qūnavī understood God's knowledge of Himself to be the root of all knowledge. On the surface, this formulation and the logical corollaries flowing from it appear to seal man's incapacity to discover the “realities of things” on his own (i.e., by his own inborn faculties).

In a representative sense, human knowledge may be said to rest on the relation between two distinct, irreducible “realities”: subject and object. Given this subject-object distinction and the limitations of our own faculties, how could we ever know the “realities of things”? This theme permeates virtually all of Qūnavī's works. In his Introduction, he discussed several passages from Ibn Sīnā's posthumous "al-Ta'liqāt" (notebook). The only source he cared to mention for Ibn Sīnā's cogitations on the “realities,” the "Ta'liqāt" contained an unusually candid remark to the effect that man was incapable of knowing the realities of things. He took up this selfsame issue with Naṣīr al-Dīn Ṭūsī (d. 672/1274) in a fascinating philosophical correspondence, where "tashkīk" ("systematic ambiguity," a concept key to later philosophy) figures. In that debate, our thinker sought to demonstrate under what conditions man may know God, a goal he shared with both philosophers and mystics.

In a larger sense, Qūnavī was able to deepen the transformation of philosophical reason begun by his predecessors by virtue of a simple, incontrovertible fact: the mechanical logic of Peripatetic philosophy could not quite overcome the distinction between subject and object (the two most elementary “realities” in every act of knowing) except by correspondence, concomitance, etc. Central to his project, on the other hand, was divine self-revelation. On this matter, Ibn 'Arabī had applied notoriously convoluted reasoning, often by association and in fragmentary outbursts. But like him, Qūnavī viewed divine self-revelation or -manifestation as the unfolding of a “book” penned in the form of constructed speech.

In short, self-revelation is the reality that underlies all realities. To elaborate the principles of its unfolding, he made thorough use of the demonstrative logic championed by both the falsāsifah (Islam's Hellenized philosophers, like Ibn Sīnā) and many Islamic theologians. But the new synthesis he was so keen to elucidate for "theological science," or 'ilm ilāhī, had to be properly anchored to a logos exhibiting the same characteristic concreteness as that familiar to him from divine speech, “God’s communications” to man (e.g., the "Qur’ān"). He thus derived from traditional logic a mystical type of exegetical grammar, with its own “scale” or standard for theorization, one that bears his special imprint.

Intellectual environment
In his official biographical account of Konya's intellectual elite, Aflākī portrayed a close-knit community of mystics and scholars of a surprisingly uninhibited spiritual mien in Konya. And yet, incessant migrations to Anatolia had given this frontier capital a distinctly cosmopolitan character, making it the envy of every seeker of knowledge—Muslim, Greek and Armenian—but also innumerable foes.

This was about the time when Qūnavī's father, Majd al-Dīn Isḥāq, began his career as a statesman and, reflecting mysticism's pervasiveness, acquired the status of a revered spiritual figure. On his return journey from a pilgrimage to the holy city of Mecca, Isḥāq was accompanied by Muḥyiddīn Ibn 'Arabī, with whom he struck a deep friendship. When Isḥāq died, his companion reportedly became Ṣadr al-Dīn's stepfather by marrying the widowed mother. Although we have no direct confirmation of this marriage from the writings of Ibn 'Arabî or Qūnawî we do know that Qūnawî became Ibn 'Arabî's close disciple and was given permission to teach all of his works and Anatolia's medley spiritual and cultural character at last began to take firmer shape.

To all, language was as primordial as it was central to all spiritual and mental activity. We have only to consider the linguistic innovations of mystic-poets like Rūmī, who contributed to the secular development of a highbrow literary form of Persian. Qūnavī's peculiar bent for Arabic linguistics, on the other hand, placed him comfortably in the lap of Arabic high culture, even if his mystical "exegetical grammar" must not be collapsed with conventional Arabic grammar.

In part, Arabic provided Qūnavī with uninterrupted links with the traditional centers of learning (Damascus, Aleppo, Cairo, etc.), where the religious sciences were taught almost exclusively in the Arabic language. Numerous schools and colleges had earlier been built by the Ayyūbids in Syria and Egypt, where Arabic was studied by people who congregated from all over the Islamic world.

In his landmark work, "al-Nafaāt al-ilāhīyah", Qūnavī noted how the matter of "al-kitābah al-ūlā al-ilāhīyah" (the primary divine writing, a key feature of his doctrine) came to him in an earlier version in the City of Damascus. Damascus, at the time, had fostered a broad intellectual fraternity that was felt across the traditional lines of jurisprudence, even if the religious sciences were more deep-rooted and variegated there than in Konya. Specialized fields like ḥadīth studies, where Qūnavī was an authority and a teacher, exhibited fewer rigid doctrinal standards of admission. One of the most prestigious centers, established earlier in the twelfth century, was the Dār al-Ḥadīth al-Ashrafīyah, whose the first shaykh was celebrated Shāfi'ī muḥaddith Ibn al-Ṣāliḥ al-Shahrazūrī (d. 643/1245). Unlike Ibn 'Arabī, who prayed as a Mālikī, Qūnavī was steeped in Shāfi'ī jurisprudence, whose practitioners were abundantly represented in the schools. But while spheres of influence were more or less evenly distributed in the higher echelons of academic scholarship in centers like the Ashrafīyah, some scholars exerted an intellectual influence disproportionate to their numbers—one prominent example being Abū Shāma, the official chronicler of Damascus who kept a close liaison with the Mālikī circles from the Maghreb and Ibn 'Arabī himself.

The Mālikīs present a special case, because their small numbers in the schools belied their pervasive influence especially in the Quranic sciences. Their numerical preponderance in iqrā’ (Quran recital) and naḥw (grammar) managed to sway the general interest even more toward Arabic philology. In view of his special relationship with Ibn 'Arabī, Qūnavī had easy access to their exegetical sources. Apart from themes characteristic of Ibn 'Arabī, however, there is little evidence of anything peculiarly Mālikī or Maghrebi in the works of Qūnavī, including in grammar. His affiliations remained close to the traditional eastern centers of learning, where the Mālikīs were underrepresented. That said, Damascus was not the only place to which Qūnavī paid regular visits. He also traveled to Aleppo and Cairo, where he had a faithful following.

More intriguing is how Qūnavī's spiritual bond with Rūmī, a scholar in his own right but the self-professed opponent of bookish scholars, developed to the point of mutual admiration—according to Aflākī—as Qūnavī continued to produce works rarely equaled in the “Arabic sciences” (Huart 281–82).

The mystical philosophy of language
As the primary vehicle of human expression, language has the capacity to convey the most profound experiences available to human beings. For Qūnavī, its “devices of conveyance” (adawāt al-tawṣīl) disclosed “incorporeal and immaterial meanings,” which he explored at a certain remove from the original experience that presumably lay at the core. He may not have differed markedly from Rūmī in this respect, but he was not a “literary practitioner” (i.e., a poet) after the manner of Rūmī, nor was he even a grammarian by profession.

The challenge was to take the demonstrative science of traditional philosophy toward an exegetical grammar that could act as a quintessential language of experience, where knowledge implied the obligation to instruct in the intricacies of spiritual peregrination, but without substituting this derived knowledge for direct personal experience. This model remained legitimate so long as the central fact and semantic unity of divine speech was maintained.

What we find in the mystical reflections of Ibn 'Arabī and Qūnavī alike are encoded utterances embodying an asymmetrical division between two components of instructive knowledge. Philosophically, they consist of the mawḑū' (subject) and the maṭlūb (object of inquiry); in theological dialectics and religious sciences they are generally known as aṣl (root) and far' (branch). Thus, in Qūnavī's view the idea was not merely to posit the “root” but to know it and to determine the precise modalities of our knowledge of it. A simple, unreflective cognizance of pregiven religious fundamentals, in the manner advocated by the Salafi-minded Ibn Taymīyyah, was still knowledge; yet nothing could disentangle it from the mundane influences that normally impinge upon the human faculty of comprehension.

The central question posed in the “theological science” envisioned by Ibn Sīnā was that of “existence.” In the form of a syllogism, the theological knowledge it imparted consisted of indemonstrable premises and a conclusion. Indemonstrables were given elements in any syllogism (“givens” were posited through the senses, imagination, intellect, etc.). As a science, this grand concept of theology assembled all the pregivens derived in the lower sciences that came under its own jurisdiction, because theological science was the very ground of all sciences.

Furthermore, Ibn Sīnā saw existence as something that required more than just a natural awareness of things. In his "Nafaḥāt ilāhiyyah," Qūnavī admitted that in that banal sense one could argue the awareness of existence was simply posited by way of intuition as the “first cognizance,” for which there was no demonstrable proof or true definition and which has merely an indistinct unity. However, this was not the biggest issue, he insisted. The difficulty arose with the “second cognizance,” namely, knowledge of the “reality distinguishable in itself from other realities”—in other words, the uniqueness of the reality.

This constituted the locus of the classical philosophical dilemma that preoccupied Qūnavī. The goal of knowledge was “knowledge of the realities of things.” One may either deny this knowledge to man, on the grounds that his natural faculties were imperfect, or affirm it at the risk of according him absolute knowledge. Contrasted to the second cognizance stood the first, which consisted of the “awareness of existence” and the perception of its “thingness.” His demarcation between this indistinct thingness and singular reality corresponded to the theological division of “subject” (mawḍūc) and “object of inquiry” (maṭlūb)—what is given and what is sought by way of knowledge. The realities, in the plural, consisted of the branches, the manifold qualities of the divine essence, by which God manifests Himself.

Behind this structural view or formulation remained the vexing question: Should what is sought in the quest for knowledge be considered nothing but the original knowing subject revealed? Because the shay’ (thing) is given as the subject, like mawjūd (existent), the “cause of its knowledge is the predominance of that precept by which there is unity with the [thing] known, whatever it may be.” This “unity” between knower and known is what any claim to a knowledge of the reality ultimately had to rest upon; but it is a unity which indicated that we knew the reality in the manner in which it has revealed itself to the other reality, that of the knower, and is not a simple identity of two entities.

At any rate, it is the knower's radical otherness that renders any simple unity impossible. How then could we expect man, in his finitude and imperfection, to know not merely the “realities of things,” but God his Creator and the ultimate Reality? However, unity can be rendered viable, in a didactic sense, through the notion of the “consonance” between the two realities by way of their predominant attributes. This is possible only by virtue of “pre-existing knowledge.” Hence, in philosophy, the process of discovery moves procession-like from what is known to what is unknown. Every “theological science” from Aristotle's to Ibn Sīnā's to Qūnavī's—no matter how formal and however mellifluous or spiritually meager its utterances may be—accepted this rudimentary principle.

To Qūnavī's credit, he took pains to describe the passage, or supersession, that occurred with the knowledge of the thing as a unique reality by way of a special “unity” through consonance. In other words, knowledge of it in the form of an object of inquiry or “branch.”

There is more to this than meets the eye. Movement here is not a mechanical passage from one point to the other. The possibility of transmutation, at some given level of commonality between two distinct realities (the knower and the known), is opened up through their consonance, or munāsabah.

Works
I'jāz al-bayān fī ta’wīl Umm al-Kitāb. Second Edition. Hyderabad, Deccan: Maṭbacat Majlis Dā’irat al-Ma'ārif al-'Uthmānīyah, 1368 AH/1949 CE (also titled "Tafsir al-Fatiha") A lengthy mystical exegesis of selected Quranic verses, and his most important work.
Kitāb al-fukūk (also titled "Fakk al-Khutum"). Introd., ed. Muḥammad Khwājavī. Tehran: Intishārāt Mawlā, 1371 AHS/1413 AH, pp. 177-316. This is a short seminal commentary on Ibn 'Arabī’s "Fuṣūṣ al-ḥikam"
Kitāb al-Mufawadat. Briefwechsel Zwischen Șadr ud-Dīn-ee Qūnawī (gest. 673/1274) und Naṣīr ud-dīn Ṭūsī (gest. 672/1274). PhD Thesis. Edited and commented by Gudrun Schubert His correspondence with Nasir al-Din al-Tusi, consisting of “al-Ajwibah”, “al-As’ilah,” and “al-Mufṣiḥah.”
Kitāb al-nafaḥāt al-ilāhīyah (or Kitāb al-nafaḥāt al-rabbānīyah), ms. 1354. Paris: Bibliothèque Nationale.
Kitāb al-nuṣūṣ. Copied by Ibrāhīm al-Lārījānī, 1315. Lithographed, Tehran: Kitābkhānah Ḥāmidī, Jamādī al-Thānī 1395 AH/1354 AHS; fol. 274-300.
Miftāḥ al-ghayb al-jam' wa al-wujūd. (On margins of Miftāḥ al-uns fī sharḥ Miftāḥ ghayb al-jam' wa al-wujūd. Shams Muḥammad b. Ḥamzah b. Muḥammad al-'Uthmānī, or Ibn al-Fanārī al-Ḥanafī. Lithographed in Tehran, 1323 AH. One of Quwnawi's key works. It has long been taught to students in Iran's madrassas who have mastered the most difficult philosophical texts.
Sharḥ al-arba'īn ḥadīthan. Edited and annotated by Dr. Ḥasan Kāmil Yılmaz. Istanbul:  Yıdızlar Matbaası, 1990. Published as Tasavvufî Hadîs Şerhleri ve Konevînin Kırk Hadîs Şerhi An unfinished work on the famous 40 sayings of the Prophet of Islam. Qunawi died before completing this work but he commented on twenty-nine ḥadiths. It provides important elucidations on the "imagination" and other concepts.
Sharḥ al-asmā’ al-ḥusnā (see “Introduction” for bibliographical information on manuscripts used) A concise explanation of the ninety-nine names of God and their effects at the human level.

See also
Ibn Arabi
Qutb al-Din Shirazi
Nasir al-Din Tusi
Mulla Shams ad-Din al-Fanari

References

Sources
 
 

Islamic philosophers
1274 deaths
Sufi writers
Akbarian Sufis
Year of birth unknown
13th-century Iranian philosophers
1207 births